The Mair–Bruxner ministry or Mair ministry was the 49th ministry of the New South Wales Government, and was led by the 26th Premier, Alexander Mair, in a United Australia Party coalition with the Country Party, that was led by Michael Bruxner. The ministry was the only occasion when the Government was led by Mair, as Premier; and fourth and final occasion where Bruxner served as Deputy Premier.

Mair was first elected to the New South Wales Legislative Assembly in 1932 and served continuously until 1946. Having served as a junior minister in the third Stevens ministry and subsequently promoted, Stevens had resigned as Premier following the passing of a censure motion concerning Mair's proposal to cut government spending in order to restrain a growing deficit, with ten United Australia members crossing the floor to vote against the government. Eric Spooner had ambitions to replace Stevens as leader however Bruxner refused to join a coalition with him and Mair won the leadership ballot and hence became Premier. Bruxner was first elected to the Assembly in 1920 and served continuously until 1962. Initially a member of the Progressive Party, he served as party leader in opposition between 1922 and 1925; and resumed leadership in 1932, following the resignation of his successor, Ernest Buttenshaw. By this stage, the party was renamed as the Country Party.

This ministry covers the period from 5 August 1939 until 16 May 1941, when the 1941 state election saw the defeat of the Mair–Bruxner coalition, and the Labor Party winning government under the leadership of William McKell.

Composition of ministry
The composition of the ministry was announced by Premier Mair on 5 August 1939 for eleven days until 16 August 1939 as an "emergency cabinet" pending formation of the full ministry as a result of the turmoil following the resignation of Stevens. At that point there was a minor rearrangement.

 
Ministers are members of the Legislative Assembly unless otherwise noted.

See also

Members of the New South Wales Legislative Assembly, 1938-1941
Members of the New South Wales Legislative Council, 1937-1940
Members of the New South Wales Legislative Council, 1940-1943

References

 

! colspan="3" style="border-top: 5px solid #cccccc" | New South Wales government ministries

New South Wales ministries
1939 establishments in Australia
1941 disestablishments in Australia